Gisara urf Gidhsara is an area in the Sitamarhi district of the state of Bihar, in north-east India. Due to frequent flooding, Gisara has significant alluvial deposits. Because of its geography, the area is rich in agriculture. The main market areas (pertaining to the tertiary sector) are around Gisara Bazar and Gisara Chauraha (or square).

Geography 
A number of its buildings are ruins dating from the British occupation, including a high school and a place of worship (Gisara math). There is a bazaar near the Matha. The area is prone to flooding as it lies between two rivers, the Bagmati River and the Lakshmana (Lakhandey) River.

The Gisara panchayat lies in the middle portion of Sitamarhi district. It is bordered by the Runni Saidpur panchayat. On the north, it borders the Belsand panchayat.

Demographics 
According to the 2001 India census, Gisara had a population of 20,821. Males constituted 53% of the population, and females 47%. 19% of the population was under 6 years of age.

The literacy rate of the village was 28.57% compared to the literacy rate of state 47%, which is less than the state literacy rate. The rate of literacy has been very low and needs immediate attention of Union and State Government. The female literacy rate was 14.28%, compared to male literacy rate of 41.52%.

The total working population is 39.84% of the total population. 63.67% of the men are working population . 13.56% of the women are working population. The main working population is 33.68% of the total population. 60.08% of the men are main working population . 4.57% of the women are main working population. While the marginal working population is 6.16% of the total population. 3.59% of the men are marginal working population. 8.99% of the women are marginal working population. The total non working population is 60.16% of the total population. 36.33% of the men are non working population. 86.44% of the women are non working population.

Festivals 
The major festival of Gisara is Chhath Puja during which people offer prayers to the Hindu Sun God, Surya, also known as Surya Shashti. It is generally celebrated at home with family members and villagers. The festivals of Holi and Diwali are also widely celebrated. Other festivals such as Dusshera, Makar Sakranti, the Eid al-Fitr, Eid al-Adha, and Christmas are also celebrated to varying extents.

Cuisine 
Khichdi constitutes the lunch for most on Saturdays and is a staple food here. It consists of rice and lentils seasoned with spices and served with items such as curd, chutney, pickles, papads, ghee (clarified butter) and chokha (boiled mashed potatoes, seasoned with finely cut onions, green chilies). Afternoon meals mostly consist of rice, lentil and vegetables, while dinner consists of roti (flat bread) and vegetables. Gisara is also known for the sweet delicacies of Bihar, including Chhena ka jalebi and Kala Jamun.

Crops 
The major food crops of Gisara are rice, wheat and maize. The area is also a major producer of sugarcane, tobacco and other cash crops. Lentils, sunflower and mustard are  grown. Agriculture has given rise to many agro-based industries.

Access 
There is a 24-hour bus service connecting both Muzaffarpur and Sitamarhi with Gisara, both run by private operators. The nearest railway stations are in Muzaffarpur and Sitamarhi.

Notes

References

External links 
 "Gisara urf Gidhsara", at Villagesinindia.in.

Villages in Sitamarhi district